{{Infobox tennis biography
|name                              = Jean-Claude Barclay 
|image                             = 
|caption                           = 
|fullname                          = 
|itf_name                          = 
|country                           = 
|residence                         =
|birth_date                         = 
|birth_place                        = Paris, France
|death_date                         = 
|death_place                        = 
|height                            = 
|college                           =
|turnedpro                         =
|retired                           = 
|plays                             = Right-handed
|careerprizemoney                  =
|tennishofyear                     =
|tennishofid                       =
|website                           = 
|singlesrecord                     =
|singlestitles                     =
|highestsinglesranking             =
|currentsinglesranking             =
|AustralianOpenresult              = 
|FrenchOpenresult                  = QF (1963)
|Wimbledonresult                   = 2R (1961, 1965, 1970)
|USOpenresult                      = 1R (1965)
|Othertournaments                  = 
|MastersCupresult                  =
|WTAChampionshipsresult            =
|Olympicsresult                    =
|doublesrecord                     =
|doublestitles                     =
|highestdoublesranking             =
|currentdoublesranking             =
|grandslamsdoublesresults          =
|AustralianOpenDoublesresult       = 
|FrenchOpenDoublesresult           = QF (1970)
|WimbledonDoublesresult            = F (1963)
|USOpenDoublesresult               = 
|OthertournamentsDoubles           = 
|MastersCupDoublesresult           =
|WTAChampionshipsDoublesresult     =
|OlympicsDoublesresult             =
|Mixed                             = 
|mixedrecord                       =
|mixedtitles                       =
|AustralianOpenMixedresult         =
|FrenchOpenMixedresult             = W (1968, 1971, 1973)
|WimbledonMixedresult              = QF (1965)
|USOpenMixedresult                 = 
|Team                              = 

}}Jean-Claude Barclay''' (born 30 December 1942) is a former French international tennis player. He competed in the Davis Cup a number of times, from 1962 to 1963.

He won the mixed doubles title at the French Open in 1968, 1971 and 1973 together with his partner Françoise Dürr.

Grand Slam finals

Doubles (1 runner-up)

Mixed doubles (3 titles, 3 runner-ups)

References

External links 
 
 

1942 births
Living people
French male tennis players
Grand Slam (tennis) champions in mixed doubles
Tennis players from Paris
French Open champions